The Zambales local elections was held on May 9, 2016 as part of the 2016 general election. Voters will select candidates for all local positions: a town mayor, vice mayor and town councilors, as well as members of the Sangguniang Panlalawigan, the vice-governor, governor and representatives for the two districts of Zambales.

Dream Team
Two of the biggest political clan in Zambales have joined forces. the Deloso and Magsaysay family have joined forces this upcoming 2016 national and local elections to battle the incumbent Governor Hermogenes Ebdane's party, the Sulong Zambales Party.

According to Atty. Amor Deloso, former Governor of Zambales, his running mate will be Angel Magsaysay-Cheng, daughter of another former Governor Vicente Magsaysay (also known as GOVIC).

From Liberal Party to Partido Galing at Puso
On April 28, gubernatorial candidate and former Liberal Party candidate Amor Deloso team formally supports Grace Poe's Partido Galing at Puso party. Present at the signing of manifestation held at Iba, Zambales were Brian Poe, son of Grace Poe, Deloso, 7 board member candidates, 10 mayoralty candidates, 10 vice mayoralty candidates and municipal council candidates under Deloso Team.

Gubernatorial and Vice Gubernatorial Election

Representatives

Representative, 1st District

Representative, 2nd District

Board Members

|-bgcolor=black
|colspan=8|

|-bgcolor=black
|colspan=8|

City and Municipality Elections

1st District of Zambales

City: Olongapo City
Municipalities: Castillejos, Subic, San Marcelino

Olongapo City
Rolen Paulino is the incumbent.

Castillejos
Jose Angelo Dominguez was the incumbent, his opponent was Vice Mayor Resty Viloria.

San Marcelino
Jose Rodriguez is term limited, His son Von is his party's nominee. His opponent is Vice Mayor Elvis Soria.

Subic
Jay Khonghun is the incumbent.

2nd District of Zambales
Municipalities: Botolan, Cabangan, Candelaria, Iba, Masinloc, Palauig, San Antonio, San Felipe, San Narciso, Santa Cruz

Botolan
Doris "Bing Maniquiz" Jeresano is the incumbent.

Cabangan
Ronaldo F. Apostol is term limited. His wife, Joy is the party's nominee.

Candelaria
Napoleon Edquid is the incumbent.

Iba
Jun Rundstedt Ebdane is the incumbent.

Masinloc
Desiree S. Edora is term limited. Her husband, Jessu is the party's nominee.

Palauig
Generoso F. Amog is term limited. His brother, Melchor is the party's nominee.

San Antonio
Estela Deloso-Antipolo is the incumbent.

San Felipe
Carolyn S. Fariñas is the incumbent.

San Narciso
Peter Lim is the incumbent.

Santa Cruz
Conny Marty is term limited. Her husband, Chito is the party's nominee.

References

2016 Philippine local elections
Elections in Zambales